Büyükkabaca is a small village in Senirkent, Isparta Province, Turkey. It is 14 km distant from the centre of Senirkent and 10 km distant to Lake Eğirdir.

Villages in Isparta Province